This is a list of public art in Indiana organized by County and City.

This list applies only to works of public art accessible in an outdoor public space. For example, this does not include artwork visible inside a museum.

Most of the works mentioned are sculptures. When this is not the case (i.e. sound installation, for example) it is stated next to the title.

Adams

Decatur

Allen

Fort Wayne

Yoder

Bartholomew

That list includes Columbus, Edinburgh, and Taylorsville.

Benton

Earl Park

Blackford

Hartford City

Montpelier

Boone

Includes Lebanon and Zionsville, Indiana.

Brown

Stone Head

Story

Carroll

Delphi

Cass

Includes Galveston and Logansport, Indiana.

Clark

Clarksville

Jeffersonville

Clay

Brazil

Clinton

Frankfort

Crawford

English

Daviess

Crane

Montgomery

Odon

Washington

Dearborn

Guilford

Lawrenceburg

Decatur

Greensburg

Millhousen

Westport

DeKalb

Auburn

Butler

Waterloo

Delaware

Daleville

Muncie

Dubois

Includes Ferdinand, Celestine, Huntingburg, Ireland, Jasper, Schnellville, and Siberia, Indiana.

Elkhart

Includes Bristol, Elkhart and Goshen, Indiana.

Fayette

Connersville

Floyd

Includes Mount St. Francis and New Albany, Indiana.

Fountain

Attica

Franklin

Brookville

Oldenburg

Fulton

Rochester

Gibson

Oakland City

Princeton

Greene

Linton

Grant

Marion

Swayzee

Upland

Hancock

Greenfield

Hendricks

Plainfield

Henry

Knightstown

New Castle

Huntington

Huntington

Jasper

Rensselaer

Jefferson

Madison

Jennings

North Vernon

Johnson

Franklin

Greenwood

Knox

Vincennes

Kosciusko

Mentone

Lake

Includes Crown Point, Dyer, East Chicago, Gary, Hammond, Merrillville, Munster and Whiting, Indiana.

LaPorte

Includes LaPorte and Michigan City, Indiana.

Lawrence

Bedford

Oolitic

Madison

Includes Anderson and Chesterfield, Indiana.

Marion

Indianapolis

Marshall

Plymouth

Miami

Peru

Monroe

Bloomington

Clear Creek

Montgomery

Crawfordsville

Noble

Rome City

Parke

Marshall

Rockville

Perry

Siberia

Tell City

Troy

Pike

Petersburg

Porter

Valparaiso

Posey

Mount Vernon

New Harmony

Pulaski

Winamac

Putnam

Greencastle

Randolph

Winchester

Ripley

Batesville

Rush

Carthage

Rushville

St. Joseph

Includes Mishawaka, Notre Dame, Osceola, and South Bend.

Scott

Scottsburg

Spencer

Includes Lincoln City, Mariah Hill, Saint Meinrad, and Santa Claus, Indiana.

Steuben

Angola

Tippecanoe

Includes Battle Ground, Cairo, Lafayette, and West Lafayette, Indiana.

Tipton

Tipton

Vanderburgh

Evansville

Vermillion

Clinton

Vigo

Includes Saint Mary-of-the-Woods, Terre Haute, and West Terre Haute, Indiana.

Wabash

Wabash

Warrick

Boonville

Washington

Salem

Wayne

Cambridge City

Richmond

Wells

Bluffton

Ossian

Zanesville

White

Monticello

Whitley

Columbia City

References

 
Tourist attractions in Indiana